Nob Hill Food Carts is a food cart pod in Portland, Oregon. The pod opened in the Northwest District in 2019.

Description and history 
In August 2019, Gregg Opsahl confirmed plans to open a 14-cart pod in November. Businesses have included:
 Bing Mi
 Farmer and the Beast
 Ramen Ippo
 Tehuana Oaxacan Cuisine

In 2021, Suzette Smith of the Portland Mercury said the carts "have grown into a great little spot to have a beer and enjoy an outdoor treat" and wrote, "Situated as they are, between neighborhood houses, it's hard to imagine Nob pod will ever be the late night, street food destination of our dreams."

References

External links

 
 

2019 establishments in Oregon
Food carts in Portland, Oregon
Northwest District, Portland, Oregon